Jeanne-Irène Biya (October 12, 1935 – July 29, 1992) was the former First Lady of Cameroon and first wife of Paul Biya, who has served as the President of Cameroon since 1982. 

Jeanne-Irène Biya died in office in Yaoundé at age 56. She was succeeded by Chantal Biya as first lady of Cameroon in 1994.

References

1935 births
1992 deaths
First ladies of Cameroon
People from Centre Region (Cameroon)